Shu'ubiyya was a literary-political movement which opposed the privileged status of Arabs within the Muslim community. The vast majority of the Shu'ubis were Persian.

Terminology
The name of the movement is derived from the Qur'anic use of the word for "nations" or "peoples", šuʿūb. The verse (49:13)

In Iran

When used as a reference to a specific movement, the term refers to a response by Persian Muslims to the growing Arabization of Iran in the 9th and 10th centuries. It was primarily concerned with preserving Persian culture and protecting Persian identity.

In the late 8th and early 9th centuries, there was a resurgence of Persian national identity. This came mainly through the patronage of the Sunni Iranian Samanid dynasty. The movement left substantial records in the form of Persian literature and new forms of poetry. Most of those behind the movement were Persian, but references to Egyptians, Berbers and Arameans are attested.

In Al-Andalus
Two centuries after the end of the Shu'ubiyyah movement in the east, another form of the movement came about in Islamic Spain and was controlled by Muwallad (Iberian Muslims). It was fueled mainly by the Berbers, but included many European cultural groups as well including Galicians, Catalans (known by that time as Franks), Calabrians, and Basques. A notable example of Shu'ubi literature is the epistle (risala) of the Andalusian poet Ibn Gharsiya (Garcia).

Opposition
Ibn Qutaybah (a Persian scholar) and Al-Jahiz (an Afro-Arab) are known to have written works denouncing Shu'ubist thoughts.

Neo-Shu'ubiyya
In 1966, Sami Hanna and G.H. Gardner wrote an article "Al-Shu‘ubiyah Updated" in the Middle East Journal. The Dutch university professor Leonard C. Biegel, in his 1972 book Minorities in the Middle East: Their significance as political factor in the Arab World, coined from the article of Hanna and Gardner the term Neo-Shu'ubiyah to name the modern attempts of alternative non-Arab and often non-Muslim nationalisms in the Middle East, e.g. Assyrian nationalism, Kurdish nationalism, Berberism, Coptic nationalism, Pharaonism, Phoenicianism, Syrian nationalism. In a 1984 article, Daniel Dishon and Bruce Maddi-Weitzmann use the same neologism, Neo-Shu'ubiyya.

See also
Islamization of Iran
Ajam
Mawali
Islamistan, movement of non-Arab Islamic unity
Bashar ibn Burd, famous Shu'ubi poet
 Islam Nusantara

References

Sources
 
 
 
 
 
 
 

 
Arabization
Ethnic groups in the Arab world
Islam in Iran
Islamic terminology
Religion and race
Culture of the Abbasid Caliphate